The Girl Who Won Out is a 1917 American silent drama film directed by Eugene Moore and starring Violet MacMillan, Barbara Conley and Scott Pembroke.

Cast
 Violet MacMillan as Nancy Grimm
 Barbara Conley as Ellen
 Scott Pembroke as Chester Noble 
 Mattie Witting as Mrs. Harvey 
 Charles Hill Mailes as Mr. Wicks
 Gertrude Astor as Mrs. Walsh
 L.M. Wells as Mr. Noble
 Sherman Bainbridge as Jack Beal

References

Bibliography
 Robert B. Connelly. The Silents: Silent Feature Films, 1910-36, Volume 40, Issue 2. December Press, 1998.

External links
 

1917 films
1917 drama films
1910s English-language films
American silent feature films
Silent American drama films
American black-and-white films
Universal Pictures films
Films directed by Eugene Moore
1910s American films